Gowari is an Indian caste of cattleman or herdsmen, predominantly living in Maharashtra, Madhya Pradesh and Chhattisgarh.

Overview
The number of scheduled tribal groups in India is more than 700.  In which Gowari was also kept.  In the censuses conducted in India from 1871 to 1941, tribals have been counted as a separate religion from other religions, such as Other religion-1871, Aboriginal 1881, Forest Tribe-1891, Animist-1901, Animist-1911, Primitive-1921, Tribal Religion  -1931, "Tribe-1941" etc. have been described.  However, after the 1951 census, tribals have been counted in Hinduism.
Despite occasional errors in the literature, they do not speak a distinct language.
Gowari 
The principal deities of the Gowāris are the Kode Kodwan or deified ancestors. They are worshipped at the annual festivals, and also at weddings.

The original ancestors are said to be Kode Kodwan, the names of two Gond gods, Bāghoba (the tiger-god), and Meghnāth, son of Rāwan, after whom the Gonds are called Rāwanvansi, or descendants of Rāwan.There are only two main castes in the Gonds (1) Aadi Gond or Dhur Gond (2) Raj Gond.  Adi Gonds are those who are called ordinary Gonds, most of them are those who live in the forest away from modern civilization while Raj Gonds are those who were kings who had their own land and kingdom.  The Gond people called him Rajgond, who was earlier a chieftain or a king living among the Gond tribes.  Because he used to run the royal palace among the Gonds and the elite branch of the same king or chieftain that grew, they also came to be called Rajgond.  And later the same kings came in contact with other kings, the kings of many Gond dynasties adopted Shaivism and many adopted Hinduism, leaving their Gondi culture. according to the additional profession, there is more difference between the Gonds.  (1) Ojha or Baiga - exorcist (2) Pardhan - priest (3) Solaha - carpenter (4) Gowari - shepherd (5) Agaria - blacksmith

Distribution and Reservations of the Gowari caste. 
their population is in the Maharashtra districts of Nagpur, chandrapur, Gadchiroli, Gondia,Bhandara, and Yavatmal, wardha, Amravati. Gowari has been included in the special backward class group 2% reservation category in Maharashtra.

their population is in the Madhya Pradesh districts of Chhindwara, Balaghat, Seoni, and Mandla. gowari called in local language Gwari,Gawari,Gwara,Gowra in Madhya pradesh.Gowari has been included in the Other backward class group 14% reservation category in madhya pradesh.

their population is in the chhattisgarh districts of Durg, Raipur, and bilaspur.

Gond-Gowari has been included in the scheduled tribes  7.5% reservation category in the Central Government since 29.10.1956. Whereas Gowari has been included in the Other backward class group 27% reservation category in the Central Government since 13.07.1993 .

According to josuaproject to Gowari in India Gowari had been 10 small subgroups 
"(1)Baiga (2)Binjhwar (3) Dudh Gowari(4) Gai Gowari (5) Gaiki (6)Govit (7) Inga (8) Ladse (9) lohan tate(10) Lunjhewar."

Among these surnames are Chachane, Kohre, jamre, Gajbe, Gate, Sahare, Thakre, Neware, Bhoyar, Raut, Sonwane, Nehare, Amandare, Kavare, Bhonde, Choudhary, Mandalwar, Gujar, Sendre, Waghade, Nagose or Nangoshe etc.

But both the state and the Center consider Gowaris and Gond-Gowaris to be separate castes, consider Gowaris to be independent castes, therefore equating Gowaris with Yadavs in the Other Backward Classes, while considers Gond-Gowaris as a subgroup of Gonds.  The Gond-Gowaris have been kept at par with the Gonds in the Scheduled Tribes.

Gowari stampede

There was a stampede during a protest in Nagpur on 23 November 1994 in which 114 people from the Gowari community were killed and more than 500 were injured.

The IPHRC Reports the Gowari Killings

A monument, the Gowari Shaheed Smarak, has been built in Nagpur near Zero Milestone, (the geographical centre of India) to commemorate those who died in this tragedy.

See also 
Dhangar, another herdsman caste
Ahir
Golla
Gopal (caste)
Yadava
Sadgop
Konar (caste)

References

Herding castes
Indian castes
Social groups of Goa
Social groups of Maharashtra
Social groups of Karnataka
Social groups of Gujarat